Acarinina is an extinct genus of foraminifera belonging to the family Truncorotaloididae of the superfamily Globorotalioidea and the suborder Globigerinina. Its fossil range is from the upper Paleocene to the middle Eocene. Its type species is Acarinina nitida.

Description
The test is subglobular, close coiled and low trochospiral. It has four to five rapidly enlarging chambers per whorl. It has a cosmopolitan distribution.

Species
Species in Acarinina include:

 Acarinina africana
 Acarinina alticonica
 Acarinina angulosa
 Acarinina aquiensis
 Acarinina aspensis
 Acarinina bollii
 Acarinina boudreauxi
 Acarinina bucharensis
 Acarinina bullbrooki
 Acarinina coalingensis
 Acarinina collactea
 Acarinina compacta
 Acarinina convexa
 Acarinina cuneicamerata
 Acarinina discors
 Acarinina dzegviensis
 Acarinina echinata
 Acarinina esnaensis
 Acarinina esnehensis
 Acarinina falsospiralis
 Acarinina intermedia
 Acarinina interposita
 Acarinina kiwensis
 Acarinina mattseensis
 Acarinina mcgowrani
 Acarinina mckannai
 Acarinina medizzai
 Acarinina microspherica
 Acarinina multicamerata
 Acarinina multiloculata
 Acarinina nachtschevanica
 Acarinina nitida
 Acarinina oblonga
 Acarinina pentacamerata
 Acarinina planodorsalis
 Acarinina praetopilensis
 Acarinina primitiva
 Acarinina proxima
 Acarinina pseudosubsphaera
 Acarinina pseudotopilensis
 Acarinina punctocarinata
 Acarinina quadratoseptata
 Acarinina quetra
 Acarinina rohri
 Acarinina rotundimarginata
 Acarinina rugosoaculeata
 Acarinina sibaiyaensis
 Acarinina sirabensis
 Acarinina soldadoensis
 Acarinina spinuloinflata
 Acarinina strabocella
 Acarinina subintermedia
 Acarinina subsphaerica
 Acarinina topilensis
 Acarinina umbilicata
 Acarinina umbonata
 Acarinina vedica
 Acarinina wilcoxensis

References

Foraminifera genera
Globigerinina